Leyte's 1st congressional district is one of the five congressional districts of the Philippines in the province of Leyte. It has been represented in the House of Representatives of the Philippines since 1916 and earlier in the Philippine Assembly from 1907 to 1916. The district consists of the provincial capital, Tacloban, and adjacent municipalities of Alangalang, Babatngon, Palo, San Miguel, Santa Fe, Tanauan and Tolosa. It is currently represented in the 19th Congress by Martin Romualdez of the Lakas–CMD (Lakas).

Representation history

Election results

2022

2019

2016

2013

2010

See also
Legislative districts of Leyte

References

Congressional districts of the Philippines
Politics of Leyte (province)
1907 establishments in the Philippines
Congressional districts of Eastern Visayas
Constituencies established in 1907